Srinivasan Chandrasekaran (born 1945) is an Indian organic and organometallic chemist, academic and a former chair of the Department of Organic Chemistry and the Division of Chemical Sciences and a former Dean of the Faculty of Science at Indian Institute of Science. He was known for his researches on organic reaction mechanisms and organic synthesis. and was an elected fellow of the Indian National Science Academy, The World Academy of Sciences and the Indian Academy of Sciences. The Council of Scientific and Industrial Research, the apex agency of the Government of India for scientific research, awarded him the Shanti Swarup Bhatnagar Prize for Science and Technology, one of the highest Indian science awards, in 1989, for his contributions to chemical sciences.

Biography 

S. Chandrasekaran, born on 15 November 1945 in the south Indian state of Tamil Nadu, did his college studies at Ramakrishna Mission Vivekananda College of Madras University from where he completed his graduate and master's degrees and secured a PhD from the same university in 1972, studying under the guidance of S. Swaminathan; his thesis was based on oxy-Cope rearrangement and on the synthesis of novel norbornane derivatives. Moving to the US, he did his post-doctoral studies in the laboratory of E.J. Corey at Harvard University (1973–75) and on completion of the studies, worked as a scientist at Syntex Research Laboratories during 1975–76. He stayed in the US for one more year, resuming his researches at Corey's laboratory before returning to India in 1977 to join IIT, Kanpur as a lecturer in chemistry. After 12 years of service there, he shifted his base to Bengaluru to continue his service at Indian Institute of Science. He held several positions at IISc including those of the chair of Department of Organic Chemistry and the Division of Chemical Sciences as well as the Dean of the Faculty of Science.

Chandrasekaran lives in Bengaluru and serves as an honorary professor at the Indian Institute of Science.

Legacy 
During his post-doctoral studies with Corey, Chandrasekaran was able to accomplish the synthesis of gibberellic acid, a plant growth hormone, successfully for the first time. Later at Syntex, he worked on the synthesis of beta-lactam antibiotics. Subsequently, working on organic reaction mechanisms, he developed a set of new organic synthesis reagents and using them, accomplished the creation of the carbon constellations. His researches have been documented by way of several articles published in peer-reviewed journals and ResearchGate, an online article repository has listed 318 of them. Besides, he has contributed chapters to two books; 3 chapters to Encyclopedia of Reagents for Organic Synthesis and one chapter to Particle Swarm Optimization.  He has also mentored several scholars in their studies and has delivered keynote addresses and plenary speeches. He was involved with the functioning of many science societies; executive committee membership and chair of International Union of Pure and Applied Chemistry, chair of the national committee of the Indian National Science Academy, secretaryship of the Indian Academy of Sciences and the presidency of the Chemical Research Society of India were some of those responsibilities.

Awards and honors 
Chandrasekharan received the Basudeb Banerjee Memorial Medal of the Indian Chemical Society in 1988 and the Council of Scientific and Industrial Research awarded him the Shanti Swarup Bhatnagar Prize, one of the highest Indian science awards, in 1989. The Indian Academy of Sciences elected him as their fellow the same year and the Indian National Science Academy and The World Academy of Sciences followed suit in 1992 and 1999 respectively. The other awards he has received include Silver Medal of the Chemical Research Society of India, Golden Jubilee Commemoration Medal (2007) of Indian National Science Academy and the Alumni Award of Excellence of Indian Institute of Science. He has also held the J. C. Bose National Fellowship of Department of Science and Technology and the Distinguished Fellowship of the Science and Engineering Research Board.

Selected bibliography

Chapters in books

Articles

See also 
 E.J. Corey
 Gibberellic acid
 Beta-lactam

Notes

References

External links 
 

Recipients of the Shanti Swarup Bhatnagar Award in Chemical Science
1945 births
Indian scientific authors
Fellows of the Indian Academy of Sciences
Fellows of the Indian National Science Academy
TWAS fellows
Scientists from Tamil Nadu
Tamil scientists
University of Madras alumni
Genome editing
Harvard University alumni
History of biotechnology
Academic staff of the Indian Institute of Science
Indian organic chemists
Living people
Academic staff of IIT Kanpur
Indian Tamil people